Elizabeth Akehurst (born 24 June 1975) is a South African former cricketer who played as an all-rounder. She appeared in eight One Day Internationals for South Africa between 1997 and 1999.

References

External links
 
 

1975 births
Living people
South African women cricketers
South Africa women One Day International cricketers